is a Japanese professional footballer who plays as a midfielder for Tokyo Verdy.

References

External links

2001 births
Living people
Japanese footballers
Association football midfielders
Tokyo Verdy players
J2 League players